Noriyuki Nishitani (born 11 February 1965) is a Japanese sport shooter who competed in the 2000 Summer Olympics.

References

1965 births
Living people
Japanese male sport shooters
ISSF pistol shooters
Olympic shooters of Japan
Shooters at the 2000 Summer Olympics
Shooters at the 1994 Asian Games
Shooters at the 1998 Asian Games
Asian Games medalists in shooting
Asian Games silver medalists for Japan
Asian Games bronze medalists for Japan
Medalists at the 1998 Asian Games
20th-century Japanese people